In mathematics, specifically in homotopy theory in the context of a model category M, a fibrant object A of M is an object that has a fibration to the terminal object of the category.

Properties

The fibrant objects of a closed model category are characterized by having a right lifting property with respect to any trivial cofibration in the category.  This property makes fibrant objects the "correct" objects on which to define homotopy groups.  In the context of the theory of simplicial sets, the fibrant objects are known as Kan complexes after Daniel Kan. They are the Kan fibrations over a point.

References
P.G. Goerss and J.F. Jardine, Simplicial Homotopy Theory, Progress in Math., Vol. 174, Birkhauser, Boston-Basel-Berlin, 1999.  .

Homotopy theory
Objects (category theory)